Rujak (Indonesian spelling) or Rojak (Malay spelling) is a salad dish of Javanese origin, commonly found in Indonesia, Malaysia and Singapore. The most popular variant in all three countries is a salad composed of a mixture of sliced fruit and vegetables served with a spicy palm sugar dressing. It is often described as tangy and spicy fruit salad due to its sweet, hot and spicy dressing made from ground chilli, palm sugar and peanuts.

There is a diverse variety of preparations, especially in Indonesian cuisine, and rujak is widely available throughout Indonesia. While the most common variant is primarily composed of fruits and vegetables, its sweet and tangy dressing is often made with prawn paste. Some recipes may contain seafood or meat components, especially in Malaysia and Singapore where a notable variant shows influence from Indian Muslim cuisine.

Etymology

Rujak is one of the oldest dishes and the earliest historically identified food of ancient Java. The word "rujak" came from the word rurujak in ancient Javanese Taji inscription (901 CE) from the era of Mataram Kingdom in Central Java.

The dish was later introduced to other regions and neighboring countries by the Javanese diaspora, as well as Indian descents who had lived in Java. In Malaysia and Singapore, it is spelled as "rojak".

Cultural significance

In Indonesia, particularly among the Javanese, the sweet, spicy and sour tastes of rojak is popular among pregnant women; this craving for unripe mango and other sour-tasting fruits is known as "ngidham" or "nyidham" in Javanese. In Javanese culture, rujak is an essential part of the traditional prenatal ceremony called Naloni Mitoni or tujuh bulanan (literally: seventh month), and is meant to wish the mother-to-be a safe, smooth and successful labour. Special fruit rujak is made for this occasion, and later served to the mother-to-be and her guests, primarily her female friends. The recipe of rujak for this ceremony is similar to typical Indonesian fruit rujak, with the exceptions that the fruits are roughly shredded instead of thinly sliced, and that jeruk bali (pomelo/pink grapefruit) is an essential ingredient. It is believed that if the rujak overall tastes sweet, the unborn would be a girl, and if it is spicy, the unborn baby is a boy.

Mangarabar, or rujak making, is a special event for the inhabitants of the Batak Mandailing region in Tapanuli, North Sumatra, Indonesia after the harvest. Normally the whole village will be involved in making and consuming the rujak.

In Malaysia and Singapore, "rojak" is also used as a colloquial expression for an eclectic mix, in particular as a word describing the multi-ethnic character of Malaysian and Singaporean society.

Indonesian rujak

Rujak Buah (fruit rujak)

In Indonesia, Rujak buah is also known as rujak manis (sweet rujak). The typical Indonesian fruit rujak consists of slices of assorted tropical fruits such as jambu air (water apple), pineapple, unripe mangoes, bengkoang (jicama), cucumber, kedondong and raw red ubi jalar (sweet potato). Sometimes Malang variants of green apple, belimbing (starfruit) and jeruk Bali (pomelo) are added. The sweet and spicy-hot bumbu rujak dressing is made of water, gula jawa (palm sugar), asem jawa (tamarind), crushed peanuts, terasi (prawn paste), salt, bird's eye chilli and red chilli. All of the fruits are cut to bite-size pieces, and put in the dish.

The bumbu rujak or thick sweet spicy rujak dressing is poured on the fruit slices. An addition of sambal garam powder (a simple mixture of salt and ground red chilli) is put on side as the alternative for those who prefer a salty taste for their rujak. The Javanese people call this kind of rujak as lotis.

Rujak Cuka
Rujak cuka literally means "vinegar rujak". It is a speciality of Sundanese cuisine of West Java, noted for its sour freshness. It is made of shredded fruits such as pineapple and unripe mango, and vegetables such as jícama, cabbage, bean sprouts and cucumber. It is quite similar to asinan due to its sour and spicy dressing, since both dishes contain vinegar, palm sugar and chilli.

Rujak Tumbuk (Rujak Bēbēk)

This is another variant of Indonesian fruit rujak which comes from West Java. The ingredients are almost the same as typical Indonesian fruit rujak, with the exception that all the ingredients are being ground or mashed together (tumbuk or bēbēk in Indonesian) in a wooden mortar. The fruits being ground are young/green pisang batu (a species of plantain), raw red yam, jicama, Java apple, kedondong and young unripe mango. The dressing is not poured on the fruit, but mashed together with all the ingredients. The dressing contains terasi prawn paste, palm sugar, salt and birds-eye chilli. Traditionally, rujak tumbuk is served in individual smaller portions on banana leaf plates called pincuk. However today, it is also commonly served in plastic cups.

Rujak Serut
This literally means "shredded rujak", and is another variant of Indonesian fruit rujak. As with rujak tumbuk, the ingredients are similar to Indonesian fruit rujak, with the exceptions that the fruits are not cut into bite-sized pieces, but shredded into a roughly grated consistency.

Rujak u' Groeh
A delicacy from Aceh province, this rujak consists of very young and tender coconut meat, young (green) papaya, bird's eye chilli, sugar, palm sugar, ice, salt and a dash of lime. This rujak is best eaten cold.

Rujak Pengantin
"Pengantin" means "bride-and-groom pair" in Indonesian. This rujak is reminiscent of Indonesia's colonial cuisine. It contains slices of boiled eggs, potatoes, fried tofu, pineapple, carrot, bean sprouts, pickles, chilli, lettuce, cabbage, cucumber, emping crackers, roasted peanuts, peanut sauce and little vinegar. In some variants, the peanut sauce is mixed with mayonnaise. It is somewhat like Central Javanese gado-gado.

Rujak Kuah Pindang

Rujak is a popular street food in Bali. A Balinese variation of the Indonesian fruit rujak, but instead of the normal rujak dressing, the fruits are soaked in a spiced fish broth. The broth consists of terasi (fermented prawn paste), salt, bird's eye chilli, red chilli and pindang fish broth.

Rujak Cingur

Cingur (pronounced "ching-ur") literally means "mouth" in Javanese. This variant of rujak originates from Surabaya. This speciality rujak from East Java has a "meaty" taste. It contains slices of cooked buffalo or cow lips, bangkuang, unripe mango, pineapple, cucumber, kangkung, lontong (rice cake), tofu and tempe, all served in a black sauce made from petis (black fermented prawn paste, related to terasi) and crushed peanuts. It is topped with a sprinkle of fried shallots and kerupuk (Indonesian prawn crackers).

Rujak Petis
This is another variant of rujak from Surabaya. It contains slices of bangkuang, unripe mango, cucumber, kangkung (water spinach), kedondong, tofu and soybean sprouts all served in a black sauce made from petis (sticky black fermented prawn paste, related to terasi), fried shallots, salt, palm sugar, unripe banana and crushed peanuts. Traditionally it is served on a banana leaf; today it is more commonly served on plates.

Rujak Tolet
Similar to fruit rujak, and also from Surabaya. Aside from unripe fruits the rojak also includes fried tofu, fried garlic and optionally beef tendons. The sauce is petis-based mixed with palm sugar, slices of raw bird's eye chilli and sweet soy sauce.

Rujak Juhi

Juhi means salted cuttlefish in Indonesian; this rujak contains fried tau kwa tofu, fried boiled potatoes, fried shredded salted cuttlefish, cucumber, noodles, lettuce, cabbages, peanut sauce, vinegar, chilli and fried garlic. This dish was originated from the Chinese community in Batavia (now Jakarta) and now has become a Betawi dish closely related with Asinan Betawi.

Rujak Shanghai

Named after "Bioscoop Shanghay" (a cinema named after Shanghai, China's most populated city) In Batavia Kota area, this dish was created by Indonesia's Chinese community. This variant of rujak can be found in Indonesian Chinatowns in cities such as Glodok in Jakarta. Rujak Shanghai contains seafood, like Rujak Juhi. Boiled sliced gurita (octopus) and edible jellyfish are served with kangkung, and served with thick red sweet and sour sauce, mixed with pineapple juice, and toasted crushed peanuts. Usually chilli sauce and pickled bengkoang are served as condiments.

Rujak Soto
A delicacy from Banyuwangi, East Java, it is a unique blend between beef soto and rujak cingur. A local speciality in which the vegetables (water spinach and bean sprouts) rujak served with lontong rice cake in petis sauce poured with soto soup. It was created in 1975 by Usni Solihin.

Rujak Es Krim
The speciality dessert from Yogyakarta. Fruit rujak mixed with ice cream made from coconut milk. It is also served with sambal.

Rujak Mie
Rujak mie is a dish from Palembang. The dish consists of noodles, tofu, slices of pempek, cucumber, lettuce, and cuko (sweet spicy broth).

Malaysian and Singaporean rojak

Rojak Buah (fruit rojak)

In Malaysia and Singapore, fruit rojak typically consists of cucumber, pineapple, jícama, bean sprouts, taupok (puffy, deep-fried tofu) and youtiao (cut-up Chinese-style fritters).  Unripe mangoes and green apples are less commonly used. The dressing is made of water, belacan, sugar, chilli and lime juice. Ingredients vary among vendors, with some adding prawn paste (hae ko in Hokkien), tamarind or black bean paste to the mix. The ingredients are cut into bite-sized portions and tossed in a bowl with the dressing, and topped with crushed peanuts and a dash of ground or sliced torch ginger bud (bunga kantan in Malay).

A popular variant found in Penang, Malaysia is Rojak Penang, which adds jambu air, guava, squid fritters and honey to the mixture, and emphasizes the use of tart fruits such as unripe mangoes and green apples, while bean sprouts and fried tofu puffs are usually omitted. The sauce or dressing for the rojak tends to be very thick, with an almost toffee-like consistency.

Rojak India 

In Malaysia, mamak rojak (also known as Indian rojak or Pasembur) is associated with Mamak stalls, which are Muslim Malaysian Indian food stalls where rojak mamak is a popular dish. It contains fried dough fritters, tofu, boiled potatoes, prawn fritters, hard boiled eggs, bean sprouts, cuttlefish and cucumber mixed with a sweet thick, spicy peanut sauce.  In the northwestern states of Peninsular Malaysia such as Penang, and Kedah, it is always called pasembur, while in Kuala Lumpur it is called rojak mamak.

In Singapore, Indian rojak consists of an assortment of potatoes, hard-boiled eggs, tofu and prawn fritters, often colorfully dyed.  Customers typically select their favorite items from a display, after which they are heated up in a wok, chopped up, and served with a sweet and spicy peanut and chilli sauce on the side for dipping.

Rojak Bandung 
A Singaporean dish known as Rojak Bandung contains cuttlefish, kangkung, cucumber, tofu, peanuts, chilli and sauce. Rojak Bandung has no relation to the Indonesian city of Bandung; in the Malay language, the term bandung means "pairs".

See also

References

External links

 Rujak Buah, Indonesian fruit rujak recipe
 Rojak recipe
 Images of Indonesian Fruit Salad: Rujak in Pinterest

Vegetable dishes of Indonesia
Street food in Indonesia
Malaysian cuisine
Singaporean cuisine
Malay cuisine
Indian diaspora in Singapore
Salads
Vegetable dishes
Fruit dishes